Copeland's method is a ranked voting method based on a scoring system of pairwise "wins", "losses", and "ties".  The method has a long history:

 Ramon Llull described the system in 1299, so it is sometimes referred to as "Llull's method"
 The Marquis de Condorcet described a similar system in the 1780s, so the method could be referred to as "Condorcet's method", but instead other systems were subsequently devised that choose the Condorcet winner.
 Arthur Herbert Copeland described the system in the 1950s, so it has been frequently been called "Copeland's method".

Each voter is asked to rank candidates in order of preference. A candidate A is said to have majority preference over another candidate B if more voters prefer A to B than prefer B to A; if the numbers are equal then there is a preference tie. The Copeland score for a candidate is the number of other candidates over whom they have a majority preference plus half the number of candidates with whom they have a preference tie. The winner of the election under Copeland's method is the candidate with the highest Copeland score; under Condorcet's method this candidate wins only if they have the maximum possible score of  where  is the number of candidates. Hence victory under this system amounts to satisfying the Condorcet criterion.

Any voting method satisfying the Condorcet winner criterion may sometimes be referred to as "a Condorcet method". Other methods that satisfy the Condorcet winner criterion include the Kemeny–Young method, the Schulze method, and Minimax.

History 
Copeland's method was devised by Ramon Llull in his 1299 treatise Ars Electionis and discussed by Nicholas of Cusa in the fifteenth century and by the Marquis de Condorcet in the eighteenth (who drew attention to the related criterion). However, it is frequently named after Arthur Herbert Copeland who advocated it independently in a 1951 lecture.

Voting mechanism

Ballot 

The input is the same as for other ranked voting systems: each voter must furnish an ordered preference list on candidates where ties are allowed (a strict weak order).

This can be done by providing each voter with a list of candidates on which to write a "1" against the most preferred candidate, a "2" against the second preference, and so forth. A voter who leaves some candidates' rankings blank is assumed to be indifferent between them but to prefer all ranked candidates to them.

Computation 

A results matrix r is constructed as follows: rij is 

 1 if more voters strictly prefer candidate i to candidate j than prefer j to i
  if the numbers are equal
 0 if more voters prefer j to i than prefer i to j.

This may be called the "1//0" method (one number for wins, ties, and losses, respectively).

By convention, rii is 0.

The Copeland score for candidate i is the sum over j of the rij. Otherwise the Condorcet method produces no decision and the candidate with greatest score is the Copeland winner (but may not be unique).

An alternative (and equivalent) way to construct the results matrix is by letting rij be 1 if more voters strictly prefer candidate i to candidate j than prefer j to i, 0 if the numbers are equal, and −1 if more voters prefer j to i than prefer i to j. In this case the matrix r is antisymmetric.

Tied preferences
The method as initially described above is sometimes called the "1//0" method. Llull himself put forward a 1/1/0 method, so that two candidates with equal support would both get the same credit as if they had beaten the other.

Preference ties become increasingly unlikely as the number of voters increases.

Use in sporting tournaments
A method related to Copeland's is commonly used in round-robin tournaments. Generally it is assumed that each pair of competitors plays the same number of games against each other. rij is the number of times competitor i won against competitor j plus half the number of draws between them.

It was adopted in precisely this form in international chess in the middle of the nineteenth century. It was adopted in the first season of the English Football League (1888–1889), the organisers having initially considered using a 1/0/0 system. For convenience the numbers were doubled, i.e. the system was written as 2/1/0 rather than as 1//0.

Sporting use differs from politics in that the scoring system is seen as one of the rules of the game with less emphasis on objective truth. For this reason modified Copeland systems using 3/1/0 scoring are commonly adopted.

(The Borda count is also analogous to sporting tournaments. Copeland's method is analogous to a tournament in which each pair of competitors play a single game whose result is determined by the entire electorate whereas the Borda count is analogous to a tournament in which every completed ballot determines the result of a game between every pair of competitors.)

Rationale
In many cases decided by Copeland's method the winner is the unique candidate satisfying the Condorcet criterion; in these cases, the arguments for that criterion (which are powerful but not universally accepted) apply equally to Copeland's method.

When there is no Condorcet winner Copeland's method seeks to make a decision by a natural extension of the Condorcet method, combining preferences by simple addition. The justification for this lies more in its intuitive appeal than in any logical arguments. 

The Borda count is another method which combines preferences additively. The salient difference is that a voter's preference for one candidate over another has a weight in the Borda system which increases with the number of candidates ranked between them. The argument from the viewpoint of the Borda count is that the number of intervening candidates gives an indication of the strength of the preference; the counter-argument is that it depends to a worrying degree on which candidates stood in the election.

Partha Dasgupta and Eric Maskin sought to justify Copeland's method in a popular journal, where they compare it with the Borda count and plurality voting. Their argument turns on the merits of the Condorcet criterion, paying particular attention to opinions lying on a spectrum. The use of Copeland's method in the first instance, and then of a tie-break, to decide elections with no Condorcet winner is presented as "perhaps the simplest modification" to the Condorcet method.

Tied results
Like any voting method, Copeland's may give rise to tied results if two candidates receive equal numbers of votes; but unlike most methods, it may also lead to ties for causes which do not disappear as the electorate becomes larger. This may happen whenever there are Condorcet cycles in the voting preferences, as illustrated by the following example.

Suppose that there are four candidates, Able, Baker, Charlie and Drummond, and five voters, of whom two vote A-B-C-D, two vote B-C-D-A, and one votes D-A-B-C. The results between pairs of candidates are shown in the main part of the following table, with the Copeland score for the first candidate in the additional column.

No candidate satisfies the Condorcet criterion, and there is a Copeland tie between A and B. If there were 100 times as many voters, but they voted in roughly the same proportions (subject to sampling fluctuations), then the numbers of ballots would scale up but the Copeland scores would stay the same; for instance the 'A' row might read:

The risk of ties is particularly concerning because the main aim of Copeland's method is to produce a winner in cases when no candidate satisfies the Condorcet criterion. A simulation performed by Richard Darlington implies that for fields of up to 10 candidates, it will succeed in this task less than half the time.

In general, if voters vote according to preferences along a spectrum, then the median voter theorem guarantees the absence of Condorcet cycles. Consequently such cycles can only arise either because voters' preferences do not lie along a spectrum or because voters do not vote according to their preferences (eg. for tactical reasons).

Nicolaus Tideman and Florenz Plassman conducted a large study of reported electoral preferences. They found a significant number of cycles in the subelections, but remarked that they could be attributed wholly or largely to the smallness of the numbers of voters. They concluded that it was consistent with their data to suppose that "voting cycles will occur very rarely, if at all, in elections with many voters".

Proposed tie breaks
Instant runoff (IRV), minimax and the Borda count are natural tie-breaks. The first two are not frequently advocated for this use but are sometimes discussed in connection with Smith's method where similar considerations apply.

Dasgupta and Maskin proposed the Borda count as a Copeland tie-break: this is known as the Dasgupta-Maskin method. It had previously been used in figure-skating under the name of the 'OBO' (=one-by-one) rule. Duncan Black used a Borda tie-break in conjunction with the Condorcet criterion; this is Black's method.

The alternatives can be illustrated in the 'Able-Baker' example above, in which Able and Baker are joint Copeland winners. Charlie and Drummond are eliminated, reducing the ballots to 3 A-Bs and 2 B-As. Any tie-break will then elect Able.

Properties
Copeland's method has many of the standard desirable properties (see the table below). In particular it satisfies the Condorcet criterion, i.e. if there is a candidate who would win against each of their rivals in a binary vote, then this candidate is the winner. It follows that the Copeland method satisfies the median voter theorem which states that if views lie along a spectrum, then the winning candidate will be the one preferred by the median voter. 

The analogy between Copeland's method and sporting tournaments has been advanced (by Vincent Merlin) as a factor making it more acceptable to voters than other Condorcet algorithms.

Comparison with other systems

Examples of the Copeland Method

Example with Condorcet winner 

To find the Condorcet winner, every candidate must be matched against every other candidate in a series of imaginary one-on-one contests. In each pairing, each voter will choose the city physically closest to their location.  In each pairing the winner is the candidate preferred by a majority of voters. When results for every possible pairing have been found they are as follows:

The wins and losses of each candidate sum as follows:

Nashville, with no defeats, is the Condorcet winner. The Copeland score under the 1/0/−1 method is the number of net wins, maximized by Nashville. Since the voters expressed a preference one way or the other between every pair of candidates, the score under the 1//0 method is just the number of wins, likewise maximized by Nashville. The r matrix for this scoring system is shown in the final column.

Example without Condorcet winner 
In an election with five candidates competing for one seat, the following votes were cast using a ranked voting method (100 votes with four distinct sets):

In this example there are some tied votes: for instance 10% of the voters assigned no position to B or C in their rankings;  they are therefore considered to have tied these candidates with each other while ranking them below D, A and E.

The results of the 10 possible pairwise comparisons between the candidates are as follows:

The wins and losses of each candidate sum as follows:

No Condorcet winner (candidate who beats all other candidates in pairwise comparisons) exists. Candidate A is the Copeland winner. Again there is no pair of candidates between whom the voters express no preference.

Use for producing a tabulation in other methods
Since Copeland's method produces a total ordering of candidates by score and is simple to compute, it is often useful for producing a sorted list of candidates in conjunction with another voting method which does not produce a total order. For example, the Schulze and Ranked pairs methods produce a transitive partial ordering of candidates, which generally produces a single winner, but not a unique way of tabulating runner-ups.  Applying Copeland's method according to the respective method's partial ordering will yield a total order (topological ordering) guaranteed to be compatible with the method's partial order, and is simpler than a depth-first search when the partial order is given by an adjacency matrix. 

More generally, the Copeland score has the useful property that if there is a subset S of candidates such that every candidate in S will beat every candidate not in S, then there exists a threshold θ such that every candidate with a Copeland score above θ is in S while every candidate with a Copeland score below θ is not in S. This makes the Copeland score practical for finding various subsets of candidates that may be of interest, such as the Smith set or the dominant mutual third set.

External links
 Eric Pacuit, "Voting Methods", The Stanford Encyclopedia of Philosophy (Fall 2019 Edition), Edward N. Zalta (ed.)
Condorcet Class PHP library supporting multiple Condorcet methods, including Copeland method.

See also
 Ranked voting
 Comparison of electoral systems
 List of democracy and elections-related topics
Voting systems
Multiwinner voting – contains information on some multiwinner variants of Copeland.

References

Notes 
 E Stensholt, "Nonmonotonicity in AV";  Voting matters; Issue 15, June 2002 (online).
 V.R. Merlin, and D.G. Saari, "Copeland Method. II. Manipulation, Monotonicity, and Paradoxes"; Journal of Economic Theory; Vol. 72, No. 1; January, 1997; 148–172.
 D.G. Saari. and V.R. Merlin, "The Copeland Method. I. Relationships and the Dictionary"; Economic Theory; Vol. 8, No. l; June, 1996; 51–76.

Monotonic Condorcet methods